Håkan Norebrink (born 21 February 1965) is a Swedish modern pentathlete. He competed at the 1992 Summer Olympics, competing in both the team and individual events.  The Swedish team placed eighth, and Norebrink finished sixth in the individual competition.

References

External links
 

1965 births
Living people
Swedish male modern pentathletes
Olympic modern pentathletes of Sweden
Modern pentathletes at the 1992 Summer Olympics
Sportspeople from Linköping
Sportspeople from Östergötland County
20th-century Swedish people